Thiognatha is a genus of moth in the family Gelechiidae.

Species
Thiognatha mameti Viette, 1953 (from Mauritius)
Thiognatha metachalca Meyrick, 1920 (from Kenya)

See also
List of moths of Kenya
List of moths of Mauritius

References

Markku Savela's ftp.funet.fi
De Prins, J. & De Prins, W. 2015. Afromoths, online database of Afrotropical moth species (Lepidoptera). World Wide Web electronic publication (www.afromoths.net) (03-Feb-2015)

Gelechiinae
Taxa named by Edward Meyrick
Moth genera